The discography of George Benson consists of thirty-six studio albums and five live albums on Prestige Records, Columbia Records, Verve Records, A&M Records, CTI Records, Warner Bros. Records, GRP Records, Concord Records, and Provogue Records, as well as two music DVDs.

Note: this discography consists only original releases. Reissues of previously released albums are not included into this discography. Among them are albums like "Willow Weep for Me", "Witchcraft", "Take Five", "Cast Your Fate to the Wind", "GB", "Live in Concert", "The Electrifying George Benson", "The Most Exciting New Guitarist on the Jazz Scene", "California Dreamin'", "Lil Darlin'", "Masquerade", "The Masquerade Is Over", "Live at Casa Caribe", "All Blues", "Blue Bossa", "After Hours", "Golden Legends Live", "Jazz After Hours with George Benson" and many others.

Albums

Studio albums

  Reissued as Take Five in 1979.
  Reissued as Cast Your Fate to the Wind in 1982.

Live albums

  Reissued as In Concert – Summertime in 1982.
  Jazz on a Sunday Afternoon (Vol. I, Vol. II, Vol. III) was reissued many times with such titles as: Lil Darlin' , Masquerade, The Masquerade Is Over, Live at Casa Caribe, All Blues, Blue Bossa, After Hours, Golden Legends Live, Jazz After Hours with George Benson, and others.
  Video album available as Absolutely Live on DVD (2000).
  Video album available as Live at Montreux 1986 on DVD (2005).

Compilation albums

  Compilation containing previously unreleased material.
  Compilation containing all compositions released for the first time on DVD-audio. The very first DVD-audio release of George Benson.
  Compilation containing previously unreleased on CD material.

Original recordings for motion picture soundtracks

As sideman

 Harlem Underground Band "Harlem Underground" (1976) and George Benson with the Harlem Underground Band "Erotic Moods" (1978) are from the same session. "Erotic Moods" was credited to George Benson with The Harlem Underground Band following the success of Benson's albums Breezin' and In Flight, but is not considered a George Benson album. He wasn't the frontman and it was not his scheduled release. 2 tracks from the 1978 album were also on the 1976 album.

 Gerald McCauley "The McCauley Sessions" and Cafe Soul All Stars "Love Pages" contains the same track with George Benson.

Various artists compilations

 First time "Serbian Blue" was released on vinyl.

Singles / extended plays

Singles

Singles as sideman

Extended plays

Miscellaneous recordings

Remixes

 Later was released on CD on various artists' compilation "The Stress Decade: Adventures In Clubland 1990-99" in 1999 and on various artists' compilation "DMC Classic Remixes Volume One - Legendary Producer Mixes" in 2009.
 George Benson & Lemar "Give Me the Night" is a kind of cover version and remake. It contains a vocals by Lemar and George Benson. It was released only as promo 12" vinyl single in 2004 (with original 2004 house mix) and in 2005 (with remixes by Soul Avengerz and Identity). The song was performed live in 2006 at UK Music Awards by Lemar & George Benson.

Recordings for commercials

Radio shows

Interviews

Productions

Albums produced by George Benson

Singles produced by George Benson

Videography

Video albums

Educational courses

Video releases with George Benson's participation

Music videos

Filmography

Live performances

Music videos with George Benson's participation

References
General

George Benson > Discography
 
 
 
 

Specific

Discographies of American artists
Jazz discographies
Disco discographies